Kikhpinych is a stratovolcano located in the eastern part of the Kamchatka Peninsula, which feeds the famous Valley of Geysers.

At its foot is a  area known as the "Valley of Death", where volcanic gases accumulate and kill birds and mammals that enter the valley. Research in the 1970s and 1980s showed that a mix of hydrogen sulphide, carbon dioxide, sulphur dioxide and carbon disulphide was produced by the volcano, gathering in a valley area where it could not be easily dispersed by winds and creating a predator trap. The gas forms in spring when the snow melts, first killing birds which drink at the river, followed by foxes and other carnivores which are attracted to the carrion.

See also
 List of volcanoes in Russia

References 

Mountains of the Kamchatka Peninsula
Volcanoes of the Kamchatka Peninsula
Stratovolcanoes of Russia
Holocene stratovolcanoes
Holocene Asia